Émile-Joseph-Maurice Chevé (May 31, 1804 – August 25, 1864) was a French music theorist and music teacher.

Chevé was born in Douarnenez. He entered the Marines at age 16 and qualified there to become a doctor and surgeon. In 1835, he returned to Paris and studied medicine and mathematics. He also visited a course taught by Aimé Paris, who propagated a music notation system inherited from Pierre Galin that is now known as the Galin-Paris-Chevé system. He was very attracted to the method, and when he ended up marrying Paris's sister Nanine, he promoted and developed it together with Paris. This system is still used in China and other countries, known as the numbered musical notation.

From 1844, he gave in Paris more than 150 courses in the method, which became known as the Galin-Paris-Chevé method. He also edited with his wife a series of textbooks that were used at such schools as the École normale supérieure, the École polytechnique and the Lycée Louis-le-Grand.

His son Amand Chevé carried forth his interest in the system. Under John Curwen it came into the English-speaking world, and was carried by Lowell Mason into the United States. A hundred years later, the Hungarian music educator Zoltán Kodály adapted the system in his Kodály Method.

He is also the uncle of Émile-Frédéric-Maurice Chevé (1829-1897), a poet.

Writings
 Méthode élémentaire de musique vocale, théorie et pratique, chiffrée et portée
 Méthode d'harmonie et de composition
 800 duos gradués
 Méthode élémentaire de piano
 Appel au bon sens de toutes les nations qui désirent voir se généraliser chez elles l'enseignement musical
 Protestation adressée au comité central d'instruction primaire de la ville de Paris, contre un rapport de la Commission de chant 
 La routine et le bon sens
 Coup de grâce à la routine musicale

References

Further reading
 Edwin E. Gordon: Learning Sequences in Music: A Contemporary Music Learning Theory, GIA Publications, 2007, p. 83 ff.

1804 births
1864 deaths
French music theorists
French music educators
French male non-fiction writers
19th-century musicologists